The 1990 Virginia Slims of Washington was a women's tennis tournament played on indoor carpet courts at the GWU Charles Smith Center in Washington, D.C. in the United States and was part of Tier II of the 1990 WTA Tour. It was the 17th edition of the tournament and ran from February 19 through February 25, 1990. First-seeded Martina Navratilova won the singles title, her ninth at the event.

Finals

Singles
  Martina Navratilova defeated  Zina Garrison 6–1, 6–0
 It was Navratilova's 2nd singles title of the year and the 148th of her career.

Doubles
 Zina Garrison /  Martina Navratilova defeated  Ann Henricksson /  Dinky Van Rensburg 6–0, 6–3

References

External links
 ITF tournament edition details
 Tournament draws

Virginia Slims of Washington
Virginia Slims of Washington
Virginia Slims of Washington
1990 in American tennis